Verhackert is an Austrian spread made out of chopped bacon, minced garlic and salt. It bears similarities to bacon jam, a bacon-based relish which includes sugar unlike verhackert. The spread was invented in Styria, Austria and is usually served cold on thick slices of bread.

Recipe 
Verhackert is typically made with chopped speck or bacon which is mixed with minced garlic and pumpkin seed oil. The speck goes through a process of salt-curing and cold-smoking before being prepared as verhackert.

References 

Austrian cuisine
Spreads (food)